Kankakee Township is the name of two townships in the U.S. state of Indiana:

 Kankakee Township, Jasper County, Indiana
 Kankakee Township, LaPorte County, Indiana

Indiana township disambiguation pages